Scott William Sloan  (2 July 1954 — 23 April 2019)FRS FREng FAA FTSE was laureate Professor of Civil Engineering at the University of Newcastle.

Education
Sloan was educated at Monash University where he was awarded Bachelor of Engineering and Master of Engineering degrees. He went on to study at the University of Cambridge where he was awarded a PhD in 1981 for numerical analysis of incompressible and plastic solids using finite elements.

Awards and honours
In 2009, Sloan was awarded an Australian Laureate Fellowship.

Sloan was elected a Fellow of the Royal Society (FRS) in 2015. His certificate of election reads:

Sloan was named as the Government of New South Wales Scientist of the Year in 2015 and gave the Rankine Lecture in 2011.

In January 2018 Sloan was made an Officer of the Order of Australia (AO) for " distinguished service to education, particularly in the field of geotechnical engineering, as an academic and researcher, to professional associations, and as a mentor of young engineers".

References

1954 births
2019 deaths
Fellows of the Royal Society
Fellows of the Australian Academy of Science
Officers of the Order of Australia